The American daily newspaper The New York Times publishes multiple weekly list ranking the best selling books in the United States. The lists are split in three genres—fiction, nonfiction and children's books. Both the fiction and nonfiction lists are further split into multiple lists.

Fiction
The following list ranks the best selling fiction books, in the hardcover fiction category.

Nonfiction
The following list ranks the best selling nonfiction books, in the hardcover nonfiction category.

See also
 Publishers Weekly list of bestselling novels in the United States in the 2000s

References

2006
.
New York Times best sellers
New York Times best sellers
New York Times best sellers